A bailey or ward in a fortification is a courtyard enclosed by a curtain wall. In particular, an early type of European castle was known as a motte-and-bailey. Castles can have more than one bailey. Their layout depends both on the local topography and the level of fortification technology employed, ranging from simple enclosures to elaborate concentric defences. In addition to the gradual evolution of more complex castle plans,
there are also significant differences in regional traditions of military architecture regarding the subdivision into baileys.

Upper, lower, middle, inner and outer wards or baileys
Baileys can be arranged in sequence along a hill (as in a spur castle), giving an upper bailey and lower bailey. They can also be nested one inside the other, as in a concentric castle, giving an outer bailey and inner bailey. Large castles may have two outer baileys; if in line they may form an outer and middle bailey. On the other hand, tower houses lack an enclosed bailey.

The most important and prestigious buildings, such as the great hall and the keep or bergfried, were usually located in the inner bailey of the castle, sometimes called the central bailey or main bailey. Nonetheless, there are a few castles where the keep is outside the inner bailey, such as Château de Dourdan and Flint Castle. The lower or outer bailey often held less important structures, such as stables, if there was not enough space in the inner bailey.

Outer baileys could also be largely defensive in function, without significant buildings. In the concentric castles of the military orders, such as Krak des Chevaliers or Belvoir, the inner bailey resembled a cloistered monastery, while the outer bailey was little more than a narrow passage between the concentric enceintes. In general, baileys could have any shape, including irregular or elongated ones, when the walls followed the contour lines of the terrain where the castle was sited. Rectangular shapes are very common (as in castra and quadrangular castles).

A particularly complex arrangement of baileys can be found at Château Gaillard. There is both a lower bailey separated from the main castle by a deep ditch, and a concentric arrangement inside the main castle with an inner and middle bailey.

Holy Roman Empire
In the Germanic castles of the Holy Roman Empire, there is a distinction between a Vorburg and a Kernburg roughly corresponding to lower and upper baileys in English castles. In German-speaking countries, many castles had double curtain walls with a narrow enclosure outside the main walls, acting as a killing ground between them, referred to as a zwinger. The outermost wall was a Zwingermauer or type of low mantlet wall. These were often added at vulnerable points like the gate of a castle or town, but were rarely as fully developed as in the concentric castles in Wales or the Crusader castles.

Gallery with examples of castle wards

References

Castle architecture